Linking R and intrusive R are sandhi or linking phenomena involving the appearance of the rhotic consonant (which normally corresponds to the letter ) between two consecutive morphemes where it would not normally be pronounced. These phenomena occur in many non-rhotic varieties of English, such as those in most of England and Wales, parts of the United States, and all of the Anglophone societies of the southern hemisphere, with the exception of South Africa. These phenomena first appeared in English sometime after the year 1700.

Non-rhotic varieties

By definition, non-rhotic varieties of English pronounce  only when it immediately precedes a vowel. This is called r-vocalisation, r-loss, r-deletion, r-dropping, r-lessness, or non-rhoticity.

For example, in non-rhotic varieties of English, the sound  does not occur in a word such as tuner when it is spoken in isolation, before an intonation break (in pausa), or before a word beginning with a consonant.

Hints of non-rhoticity go back as early as the 15th century, and the feature was common (at least in London) by the early 18th century.

Linking R
So tuner amp may be pronounced . Here, "closely" means the following word must be in the same prosodic unit (that is, not separated by a pausa). This phenomenon is known as linking R. Not all non-rhotic accents feature linking R. Non-rhotic varieties of Southern American English are notable for not using a linking R.

Intrusive R
For example, the phrase bacteria in it would be pronounced . The epenthetic  can be inserted to prevent hiatus (two consecutive vowel sounds).

In extreme cases an intrusive R can follow a reduced schwa, such as for the example if you hafta[r], I’ll help and in the following examples taken from the native speech of English speakers from Eastern Massachusetts: I’m gonna[r]ask Adrian, t[ər]add to his troubles, a lotta[r]apples and the[r]apples. A related phenomenon involves the dropping of a consonant at the juncture of two words and the insertion of an r in its place, sometimes this occurs in conjunction with the reduction of the final vowel in the first word to a schwa: examples of this are He shoulda[r]eaten and I saw[r]’m (for I saw them)

Other recognizable examples are the Beatles singing: "I saw-r-a film today, oh boy" in the song "A Day in the Life", from their 1967 album Sgt. Pepper's Lonely Hearts Club Band; in the song "Champagne Supernova" by Oasis: "supernova-r-in the sky"; at the Sanctus in the Catholic Mass: "Hosanna-r-in the highest"; in the song "Scenes from an Italian Restaurant" by Billy Joel: "Brenda-r-and Eddie"; in the song "Beauty and a Beat" by Justin Bieber featuring Nicki Minaj: "Eye out for Selena-r"; in the phrases, "Law-r-and order" and "Victoria-r-and Albert Museum", and even in the name "Maya-r-Angelou". This is now common enough in parts of England that, by 1997, the linguist John C. Wells considered it objectively part of Received Pronunciation, though he noted that it was still stigmatized as an incorrect pronunciation, as it is or was in some other standardized non-rhotic accents. Wells writes that at least in RP, "linking  and intrusive  are distinct only historically and orthographically".

Just as with linking R, intrusive R may also occur between a root morpheme and certain suffixes, such as draw(r)ing, withdraw(r)al, or Kafka(r)esque.

A rhotic speaker may use alternative strategies to prevent the hiatus, such as the insertion of a glottal stop to clarify the boundary between the two words. Varieties that feature linking R but not intrusive R (that is, tuna oil is pronounced ), show a clear phonemic distinction between words with and without  in the syllable coda.

Margaret Thatcher was nicknamed "Laura Norder" because of her references during her period of office to "law and order" with an intrusive /r/.

Prevalence

A 2006 study at the University of Bergen examined the pronunciation of 30 British newsreaders on nationally broadcast newscasts around the turn of the 21st century speaking what was judged to be "mainstream RP". The data used in the study consisted mostly of the newsreaders reading from prepared scripts, but also included some more informal interview segments. It was found that all the newsreaders used some linking R and 90% (27 of 30) used some intrusive R.

Overall, linking R was used in 59.8% of possible sites and intrusive R was used in 32.6% of possible sites.  The factors influencing the use of both linking and intrusive R were found to be the same.  Factors favouring the use of R-sandhi included adjacency to short words; adjacency to grammatical or non-lexical words; and informal style (interview rather than a prepared script). Factors disfavouring the use of R-sandhi included adjacency to proper names; occurrence immediately before a stressed syllable; the presence of another /r/ in the vicinity; and more formal style (prepared script rather than interview).  The following factors were proposed as accounting for the difference between the frequency of linking and intrusive R:
 overt stigmatization of intrusive R
 the speakers being professional newsreaders and thus, presumably, speech-conscious professionals
 the speakers (in most cases) reading from a written script, making the orthographic distinction between linking and intrusive R extremely salient
 the disparity between the large number of short, grammatical words that end in possible linking R (e.g. "for", "or", "are", etc.) and the absence of such words that end in possible intrusive R.

See also

Diaeresis (diacritic)
Hiatus (linguistics)
Pausa
Liaison (French)
Sandhi
R-colored vowel
Movable nu

Notes

References

Bibliography

Further reading

External links
 A century of "intrusive" R in English — video by the British linguist Geoff Lindsey
 The Intrusive /r/ and Linking /r/ - British English Pronunciation & Connected Speech

English phonology
Phonetics
Phonotactics